Arne Bergsvåg (born 2 February 1958) is a Norwegian politician for the Centre Party.

He served as a deputy representative to the Parliament of Norway from Rogaland during the term 2005–2009 and 2009–2013.

On the local level, Bergsvåg became mayor of Ølen in 1999. When it was incorporated into Vindafjord in 2005, Bergsvåg became the new mayor of that municipality. He declined to stand for another period as mayor in the municipality election in 2011.

Since 2003 he has been a member of the county council and he had the top spot on the Hordaland Centre Party's list for the election to the county council in 2011.

References

1958 births
Living people
Centre Party (Norway) politicians
Deputy members of the Storting
Mayors of places in Rogaland